Hop Sing, Hopsing or variation, may refer to:

 Hop Sing (Bonanza), a fictional character, a stereotypical Chinese housekeeper on the 1959-1973 TV Western Bonanza 
 Hop Sing Tong, the Hop Sing (合勝), a tong (堂), an ethnic Chinese organization, founded in the U.S. in 1875
 Hop Sing Boys, an ethnic Chinese crime syndicate; see List of Chinese criminal organizations
 Hop-Sing Soo (1861-1918), an early stage name for yellowface faux-Chinese American stage magician William Ellsworth Robinson, better known as Chung Ling Soo
 Hop-Sing Yim, a fictional character portrayed by Ying-Ming Lee on the 2002 PBS historical reality show Frontier House 
 "Hop Sing", a track by Longmont Potion Castle from the 2005 album Longmont Potion Castle Volume 5

See also

 Hip Sing Association (formerly, Hip Sing Tong)
 Hop (disambiguation)
 Sing (disambiguation)